The Witching Hour is a 1934 American pre-Code drama film directed by Henry Hathaway and starring Sir Guy Standing, John Halliday, Judith Allen and Tom Brown.

Plot
While Jack Brookfield (John Halliday) runs a gambling gathering at nighttime in his Kentucky house, his daughter Nancy (Judith Allen) is frequently visited by and becomes engaged to young Northern architect Clay Thorne (Tom Brown). His mother (Olive Tell), an old friend of Brookfield's, arrives from Baltimore to save her son from the vice of gambling, but when Brookfield shows her her son and his daughter in the garden, she is delighted. Brookfield announces to the gentlemen that for that evening the gambling is over early, due to a feeling he has.

After everybody has left, Brookfield's old friend (and customer) Lew Ellinger (Richard Carle) proposes to play poker. But Brookfield answers he is not a gambler. Ellinger deals the cards anyway. To his astonishment, Brookfield tells him exactly what he has in his hands. When it is repeated a second time, Brookfield tells him that he cannot tell what cards he has if Ellinger doesn't look at them. When this second time he tells again the card Ellinger has, Ellinger asks Brookfield how he does it. Brookfield does not know how he does it, but he does not gamble because of this gift, which saddens Ellinger.

Meantime, the police chief (Frank Sheridan) gathers his men to raid Brookfield's house. When they arrive, however, they can find no trace of gambling activity.

After Nancy turns in for the night, Clay becomes terrified when he sees a cats-eye ring (collateral put up by Lew) on Brookfield's finger. This causes Brookfield to question Clay's manhood.

Afterward, Brookfield receives a visit from Frank Hardmuth (Ralf Harolde). Hardmuth has a grudge against him and is determined to show that he is the boss of the town. When Hardmuth states he is good enough for Nancy, Brookfield punches him and tells him that one day a man will come in his office and shoot him. Clay overhears him. Brookfield tells him, after Hardmuth leaves, that his fear is absurd. He hypnotizes the young man without realizing it.

Judge Martin Prentice (Guy Standing) is Brookfield's last visitor that night. Brookfield finds in him an understanding person concerning his gift. Prentice warns him to be more careful about hypnotizing people.
 
Clay goes to Hardmuth's office and shoots him dead, without knowing what he is doing. His loved ones search for a defense attorney, but nobody takes hypnotism seriously or believes it is grounds for a defense. Finally, they think of Judge Prentice, who is retired, but would certainly understand how to manage the case. Prentice does not want to take the case, but the ghost of Margaret Price (Gertrude Michael), Mrs. Thorne's mother and Prentice's love, persuades him to change his mind. The trial goes badly for the defense; even the testimony of Dr. von Strohn (Ferdinand Gottschalk), an eminent expert in hypnosis, cannot turn the tide. Finally, in desperation, Prentice has Brookfield hypnotize the openly skeptical jury foreman (William Frawley) into shooting the district attorney (the gun has blanks). The jury reaches the verdict "not guilty", and Clay is a free man.

Cast
Sir Guy Standing as [Judge] Martin Prentice
John Halliday as Jack Brookfield
Judith Allen as Nancy Brookfield
Tom Brown as Clay Thorne
Olive Tell	 as Mrs. [Helen] Thorne
Richard Carle as Lew Ellinger
Ralf Harolde as Frank Hardmuth
Purnell Pratt as District Attorney [Robinson]
Frank Sheridan as Police Chief
Gertrude Michael as Margaret Price
Ferdinand Gottschalk as Dr. von Strohn
William Frawley as Foreman of Jury

Reception

Author and film critic Leonard Maltin awarded the film two and a half out of four stars, calling it "[a] Minor but well-made chiller with eerie atmosphere."

References

External links

1934 films
1934 drama films
American black-and-white films
American drama films
1930s English-language films
American courtroom films
American films based on plays
Films directed by Henry Hathaway
Films about hypnosis
Films about gambling
Paramount Pictures films
1930s legal films
1930s American films